Gilbert Bruce Kaplan (born July 9, 1951) is an American attorney and former Under Secretary of Commerce for International Trade in the United States Department of Commerce. Prior to his role at Commerce, Kaplan was a partner at King & Spalding, and is the co-founder of the Manufacturing Policy Initiative at Indiana University School of Public and Environmental Affairs. During the administration of Ronald Reagan, Kaplan served as Deputy Assistant Secretary, Acting Assistant Secretary of Commerce for Import Administration, and  Director of the Office of Investigations at the Department of Commerce. A former steel industry lobbyist, he has won cases against China.

Kaplan resigned his position at Commerce on September 19, 2019.

References

External links
 Biography at King & Spalding
 ITA biography

Living people
Harvard Law School alumni
21st-century American lawyers
Trump administration personnel
1951 births
Under Secretaries of Commerce for International Trade